Celebrity Apprentice Ireland is an Irish reality television series, in which a group of Irish celebrities compete for the chance to win  €25,000 for their chosen charity.

Caroline Downey, the managing director of MCD is the head judge in the competition with the two advisors being former politician Liz O'Donnell and entrepreneur John McGuire.

Edele Lynch beat Amanda Brunker in the final which aired on 28 October 2013. Caroline Downey awarding Lynch the title after her team's renovation challenge in a Down Syndrome Ireland Latch On educational centre, using items sourced from donedeal.ie.

Contestants

Summary
The first episode aired on TV3 on 23 September 2013. Martin Maloney of Hardy Bucks was the first celebrity to be sacked on the first show. The first task involved designing and selling custom-made T-shirts in high street store Penneys. The task was won by the girls team.

Emma Quinlan was the second celebrity to be fired after the second episode which aired on 30 September. Both teams were challenged with rolling out a themed event for Carling lager with Quinlan's team winning the public vote for the best entertainment event. However bosses at Carlsberg overturned the vote and claimed that they had missed the brief in that their event could not be rolled out to pubs nationwide. Nick Leeson and Edele Lynch were also brought back into the boardroom before Quinlan was fired.

 On the losing team
 Won as project manager on his/her team
 Lost as project manager on his/her team
 Was brought to the final boardroom
 Was fired
 Lost as project manager and was fired
 Did not participate in the task
 Winner of the competition

Episodes

Episode 1
Airdate: September 23, 2013
Task: To design and sell custom-made T-shirts in high street store Penneys.
Project managers
Athena: Daniella Moyles
Iconic: Mikey Graham
Winning team: Athena
 Losing Team: Iconic
 Reasons for loss: Iconic sold the least. Their visual design was not appealing and further errors such as spelling mistakes worsened their loss.
 Sent to boardroom: Mikey Graham, Martin Moloney, and Nick Leeson
 Fired: Martin Moloney - Caroline felt that Martin 'did not want it bad enough'. Martin also oversaw the spelling mistake and he did not say anything.

Episode 2
Airdate: September 30, 2013
Task: To roll out a themed event for Carling lager. The team that impresses Carling the most wins.
Corporate changes: Edele and Emma moved to Iconic, while Maclean and Michael moved to Athena.
Project managers
Athena: Amanda Brunker
Iconic: Emma Quinlan
Winning team: Athena
 Losing Team: Iconic
 Reasons for loss: Despite winning the public vote, Carling felt that Iconic missed the brief. Furthermore, Carling felt that their event could not be rolled out to pubs nationwide.
 Sent to boardroom: Emma Quinlan, Edele Lynch, and Nick Leeson
 Fired: Emma Quinlan - Caroline felt that the failure of the team and the idea of the event laid on Emma. Another issue was that Emma could not admit that she was wrong. She led her team down the wrong path, and Caroline was disappointed as this was Emma's area of expertise.

Celebrity Apprentice: You're Fired
Celebrity Apprentice: You're Fired is the follow-on show to Celebrity Apprentice Ireland. The first show directly followed the first episode of Celebrity Apprentice Ireland on TV3. The show is hosted by Anton Savage. The 30 minute show features a two-person celebrity guest panel in front of a studio audience that discusses the episode just aired and the fired apprentice from that episode is also interviewed.

References

2013 Irish television series debuts
2013 Irish television series endings